The 1990 Hungarian motorcycle Grand Prix was the penultimate round of the 1990 Grand Prix motorcycle racing season. It took place on the weekend of 31 August–2 September 1990 at the Hungaroring circuit.

500 cc race report
Wayne Rainey gets the start, then it’s Eddie Lawson, Kevin Schwantz, Wayne Gardner and Mick Doohan. Randy Mamola has a small highside and looks like he’s going to save it, but heads into the gravel and it falls as he bumps the tire barrier.

Doohan is on the move as he passes Gardner and Schwantz and catches up to Lawson. It’s a small gap up to Rainey. As they brake at the end of the start-finish straight, Lawson makes a mistake and goes wide, losing contact with Doohan, who catches Rainey.

Doohan passes Rainey on the straight as he did with Lawson, but Rainey can’t fight back as his bike breaks down. This is his first DNF, but the championship is sewn-up.

Doohan takes a big win, his first in 500s.

500 cc classification

References

Hungarian motorcycle Grand Prix
Hungarian
Motorcycle Grand Prix